Manojder Adbhut Bari is a 2018 Indian Bengali-language comedy drama film directed by Anindya Chatterjee based on the novel of the same name by Shirshendu Mukhopadhyay. Soumitra Chatterjee, Sandhya Roy and Abir Chatterjee play the lead roles. The film was released on 12 October 2018 under the banner of Windows Production House.

Plot
Manoj is a young boy who lives in a small town in  Bengal with his two siblings and a weird family which has his parents, grandmother, two uncles, and a very old great-grandmother. Each member in his family is a special character with some  quirk or the other. Two other members are also there at his place; one teacher who forgets all his education if he has to sit straight while studying and a music teacher, who gets suicidal every morning after singing a wrong tune.  
The story opens on a typical day at Manoj’s household where all his family members are creating chaos as usual. While a cow from their cow shed has run away, Manoj’s great-grandmother is wreaking havoc on the house. The day goes through various twists and turns with visits by a detective, who is so staunch in his professionalism that he never enters a house through the main door and a police officer, who is a peace-loving man. 
While this is going on at the house, there is a dangerous robbery being planned by a group of vicious dacoits led by a young man. They plan to rob the royal palace but the king is in rather bad shape as he is a miser with no income to speak of. While Manoj’s uncle gets involved in the robbery, Manoj gets involved in saving the royal palace. 
Drama, action and loads of laughter later, the king and queen find their lost son and Manoj gets back his family of lovely weirdos.

Cast
The cast of the film:
 Bratya Basu as Goenda Baradacharan
 Soumitra Chatterjee as Raja Gobindonarayan
 Sandhya Roy as Rani Maa
 Abir Chatterjee as Kandarpanarayan / Kodu
 Rajatava Dutta as Bhojobabu
 Silajit Majumder as Dacoit leader
 Sohag Sen as Pishima
 Aparajita Auddy as Baiji
 Manoj Mitra as Golok Master
 Ambarish Bhattacharya
 Sumit Samaddar as Nishi Daroga
 Soham Maitra as Manoj
 Purab Sheel Acharya as Saroj

Soundtrack

References

External links
 

2018 films
Bengali-language Indian films
2010s Bengali-language films
Indian children's films
Indian comedy films
Films based on Indian novels
Films scored by Shilajit Majumdar
Films scored by Shaan
Films based on works by Shirshendu Mukhopadhyay